Espiritu Airport  is an airstrip serving the ranching settlement of Espiritu in the Beni Department of Bolivia. There are numerous grass airstrips in the region.

See also

Transport in Bolivia
List of airports in Bolivia

References

External links
OpenStreetMap - Espiritu
HERE/Nokia - Espiritu

Airports in Beni Department